The Louisiana Derby is a Grade II American Thoroughbred horse race run annually at the Fair Grounds Race Course in New Orleans, Louisiana. Run in late March, the race is open to horses, age three, willing to race  miles on the dirt. It currently offers a purse of $1,000,000.

The Louisiana Derby is one of the major prep races on the Road to the Kentucky Derby.

Race history
The first race at the "Louisiana Race Course", now the Fair Grounds Race Course took place spring 1838, proprietors Bernard de Marigny, Julius C. Branch, and Henry Augustine Tayloe – son leading turfman John Tayloe III founder of the Washington (DC) Jockey Club (1789) – offered on the fifth race day "The Louisiana Plate."

A race was held in 1894 and called the Crescent City Derby. The race was later renamed in honor of Fair Grounds' home state, Louisiana.

Two winners of the Louisiana Derby have gone on to win the Kentucky Derby: Black Gold in 1924, and Grindstone in 1996. The 1988 winner, Risen Star, went on to become a "Dual Classic Winner" by winning the Preakness and Belmont Stakes.

Race venue
The race was held at Crescent City Race Course from 1894 through 1908. It was also held at Jefferson Park from 1920 through 1931. The race was not held in 1895 through 1897, 1909 through 1919, 1921 through 1922, 1940 through 1942, 1945 and 2006. In 2006, the race was cancelled because the track was partially destroyed by Hurricane Katrina.

Race distance
The race was run at one mile in 1894; it was run at  miles from 1898 until 1988. The race has been run at  miles from 1989 through 2009. On August 11, 2009 the owner of Fair Grounds, Churchill Downs Incorporated, announced that they were moving the Louisiana Derby from eight weeks prior to the Kentucky Derby to only five weeks prior. They also announced that the distance of the Louisiana Derby would be increased back to  miles.  Starting in 2020 the Louisiana Derby will be run at  miles.

Records
Speed  record:
  miles – 1:42.60 – Crypto Star (1997) 
  miles – 1:48.80 – Clev Er Tell (1977)
  miles – 1:54.38 –Epicenter (2022)

Most wins by a jockey:
 5 – Pat Day (1986, 1987, 1991, 1992, 1997)

Most wins by a trainer: ¹
 4 – Todd Pletcher (2007, 2010, 2013, 2018)
 4 – Steven M. Asmussen (2001, 2008, 2016, 2022)

Most wins by an owner:
 4 – Joe W. Brown & Dorothy D. Brown (1949, 1953, 1954, 1965, 1968, 1982)

Winners

 Winners in bold won a Triple Crown Race 
 * Denotes amount of money awarded to winner.

See also
Louisiana Derby "top three finishers" and starters
Road to the Kentucky Derby

References

External links
 The Louisiana Derby at Pedigree Query
 The Louisiana Derby at the NTRA

Fair Grounds Race Course
Flat horse races for three-year-olds
Triple Crown Prep Races
Graded stakes races in the United States
Horse races in New Orleans
Horse racing
Recurring sporting events established in 1894
1894 establishments in Louisiana
Grade 2 stakes races in the United States